With slogans like, "Purveyors of Fine Music," and "So Country, It'll Make You Puke," FortyTwenty combines old-school country, a touch of punk, energy and onstage antics that have helped the cowbilly quintet put its alternative honky-tonk stamp on juke joints, saloons, rock venues and dancehalls throughout the Midwest and south.

The group's third studio album has been recorded, but is yet to be released.

Current members
Jon Bradley: Guitar/vocals
J.J. King: drums/vocals
Lern Tilton: Upright Bass/vocals
David Wilson: Fiddle/Acoustic Guitar/vocals

Albums

Lowdown and Dirty
Tha group's first album, "Lowdown and Dirty," was released in 2003 on Slackjaw Records. The track list includes:
1. Drink About Her (Tilton)
2. Dreamin' Big and Livin' Small (Wilson)
3. The Wagon (Tilton)
4. Honky-Tonk Me (Wilson)
5. What Women Say (Tilton)
6. Hang Around (Wilson)
7. Angel (Tilton)
8. Broken Heartland (Wilson)
9. Lowdown Dirty Drinkin' (Tilton)
10. Cowboys and Hippies (Wilson)

Sober and Stupid
Tha group's second full-length studio release, "Sober and Stupid," came out in 2005 on Slackjaw Records. The album received significant radio play in various markets, reaching the No. 5 spot on the Freeform American Roots Chart, the No. 8 spot on the Euro-Americana Chart, and the No. 12 spot on XM Satellite Radio's X-Country Chart. The group recorded its 13-song disc with producer A.J. Mogis at Presto Studios in Lincoln, Nebraska. The track list includes:
1. Paulette (Tilton)
2. Life That Chose Me
3. Walk Out
4. Milk and Pancakes
5. Can't It Be Me
6. Peace, Love & Honky-Tonk
7. Skunk Yodel No. 7
8. Ceiling Fan Polka
9. Sober and Stupid
10. Doggone Happy To Be Blue
11. Sorry
12. Pancakes and Beer
13. Turn To The Whiskey

Country Music Television
In May 2004, FortyTwenty was invited to Nashville by Country Music Television to record four original acoustic songs for a segment called "New Voices, No Cover," which is now featured on FortyTwenty's CMT.com page.

Musical groups from Nebraska